Najafi may refer to:

 Najafi (surname)
 Najafi, Iran, a village
 Najaf Qoli, Lorestan, a village